Shamiram, is a village in the Shamiram Municipality of the Aragatsotn Province of Armenia. It is mostly populated by Yazidis. The village is named after the Assyrian legendary queen Semiramis.

References 

Report of the results of the 2001 Armenian Census

Populated places in Aragatsotn Province
Yazidi populated places in Armenia